The Rassower Strom is a waterway that lies at the tip of the tongue of land between the lagoons of the Wieker Bodden and Breetzer Bodden and is part of the North Rügen Bodden Chain. On its southern shore is the ferry boat landing stage between the villages of Vaschvitz and Fischersiedlung in the municipality of Trent. It separates the heartland of the island of Rügen, the Muttland, from the peninsula of Wittow in the north.

The Wittow Ferry crosses the Strom. It is a ferry service for foot passengers and vehicles (up to a permitted total weight of 30 t each).

In severe winters, when the water surface of the bodden freezes over, the Rassower Strom remains largely ice-free as a result of the current to and from the Großer Jasmunder Bodden and provides a refuge for large numbers of water fowl.

References

Geography of Rügen
North Rügen Bodden